The North Patterson Street Historic District is a historic district of 14 "grand homes" on North Patterson Street in Valdosta, Georgia.  It was listed on the National Register of Historic Places in 1984.

All but one of the homes were probably built during 1899 to 1909. The known exception is 1106 North Patterson which was designed by architect Lloyd Greer in 1919 to replace the 1902 J.C. Fender house which was moved and turned to face Mary Street instead (and is still included in the district). The expansion of downtown commercial area has destroyed grand homes which previously were located to the south of this section of Patterson Street.

It includes Classical Revival, Stick/Eastlake, and Victorian Eclectic architecture.  Classical Revival is represented by 1007 North Patterson Street, which has a monumental portico with Corinthian columns.

References

External links

Historic districts on the National Register of Historic Places in Georgia (U.S. state)
Victorian architecture in Georgia (U.S. state)
Neoclassical architecture in Georgia (U.S. state)
Buildings and structures completed in 1899
National Register of Historic Places in Lowndes County, Georgia